Blue Christmas (also called the Longest Night) in the Western Christian tradition, is a day in the Advent season marking the longest night of the year. On this day, some churches in Western Christian denominations hold a church service that honours people that have lost loved ones and are experiencing grief. These include parishes of Catholicism, Lutheranism, Methodism, Moravianism, and Reformed Christianity. The Holy Eucharist is traditionally a part of the service of worship on this day. This worship service is traditionally held on or around  the longest night of the year, which falls on or about December 21, the Winter Solstice. There is an interesting convergence for this day as it is also the traditional feast day for Saint Thomas the Apostle. This linkage invites making some connections between Saint Thomas's struggle to believe in Jesus' resurrection, the long nights just before Christmas, and the struggle with darkness and grief faced by those living with loss.

The worship often includes opportunities for expression of grief, pain, and heartbreak as well as an opportunity to focus on the promise of hope found in Christ. Candles, arranged as an Advent wreath, may be lit during the service, and empty chairs may be reserved as a way of commemorating those lost during the previous year. The images of the winter solstice, including the beginning of increasingly longer days, are a significant part of the imagery used in this worship event.

See also
Allhallowtide
Saint Thomas Day
Totensonntag

References

External links

Blue Christmas by Todd Outcalt
Blue Christmas Resources - Church Health Reader
Blue Christmas by the General Board of Discipleship (GBOD)
Blue Christmas Liturgy by The Reverend Nancy C. Townley (Cokesbury)

Advent
December observances
Observances honoring the dead